The Sharp Actius RD3D was a 3D laptop computer manufactured by the Sharp Corporation in 2004.  The company marketed it as the first "autostereo" PC, offering 3D images without glasses.

Features
It had a built-in 3D graphics button that would create a 3D image by using a "parallax barrier", which beamed two different images to each eye, confusing the brain into thinking that the user was looking at a 3D image, all without the use of 3D glasses.

Problems
Common problems with the Sharp Actius RD3D were:

The 3D graphics could reportedly not be seen if the user slightly shifted position while looking at the computer.
The computer's performance reportedly slowed when it was put into 3D mode.
It was also very big (12 pounds), bulky, and extremely expensive, selling for $2,999.
The battery life was also inferior, reportedly lasting for a mere 2 hours.

The product was featured in the "25 Worst Tech Products of All Time" list published by PC World magazine in 2006.

External links
 Sharp Actius RD review - CNET

References 

Actius RD3D
Stereoscopy